Sergey Lemokh (born as Sergey Ogurtsov) is a leader of a Soviet/Russian pop band Car-Man and rock band Carbonrock. Lemokh was born in city of Serpukhov, Soviet Union on May 14, 1965. He graduated from Moscow Cooperative Institute in 1988. In 1990 Lemokh co-founded Car-Man with Bogdan Titomir. After Titomir left in 1991, Lemokh continued as a solo leader of the band.  Lemokh wrote and recorded 5 major and a number of secondary albums with Car-Man.  In 1997 he released a solo instrumental album Polaris.

Albums
1997 - Polaris

Facts
Sergey changed his last name, Ogurtsov, to his mother's maiden name, Lemokh.  He is often called Oguretz (Russian for "cucumber").

External links
 Official Site
 Fan Site

See also
 Car-Man
 Bogdan Titomir

References

1965 births
Living people
Russian musicians
People from Serpukhov